Tamika Whitmore (born June 5, 1977) is a retired American professional basketball player who played in the WNBA.

College years
Born in Tupelo, Mississippi, Whitmore played collegiate basketball while attending the University of Memphis on a scholarship. She finished second in career scoring with 2,488 points, first in career field goal percentage at 60.6%, fourth in career rebounds with 952, and second in career blocked shots with 108.  She was the Conference USA player of the year in 1998 and 1999. She led the NCAAW in scoring during her senior year at University of Memphis.

USA Basketball
In 1998, Whitmore was named to the team representing the US at the William Jones Cup competition in Taipei, Taiwan. The USA team won all five games, earning the gold medal for the competition. Whitmore was the second leading scorer on the team, averaging 9.8 points per game over the five games.

WNBA career
In the 1999 WNBA Draft, she was selected by the New York Liberty, for whom she played for five seasons before signing a free agent contract with the Los Angeles Sparks. She played for the Sparks during the 2004 and 2005 seasons.

Afterwards, she signed another free agent contract with the Indiana Fever for the 2006 season.
In Game 2 of the Fever's semifinals matchup against the Shock, Tamika Whitmore set a WNBA record for points in a playoff game with 41, breaking Lisa Leslie's mark of 35.

On February 19, 2008, Whitmore was traded along with Indiana's 2008 first-round draft pick to the Connecticut Sun for Katie Douglas.

International career
2001–2002: Las Palmas (Spain)
2003–2004: Las Palmas (Spain)
2004–2005: Halcón Viajes Perfumerías Avenida Salamanca (Spain)
2005–2006: Mourenx BC (LFB, France)
2006 (until December): Lotos VBW Clima Gdynia (Poland)
2007 (from January): Spartak Moscow Region (Russia)
2007–2008, 2008–2009: Gambrinus Sika Brno (Czech Republic)

References

External links
WNBA Player Profile
WNBA "Who I Am" article
Sun acquires Whitmore and Fever's 2008 1st round pick for Douglas

1977 births
Living people
All-American college women's basketball players
American expatriate basketball people in France
American expatriate basketball people in Russia
American expatriate basketball people in Poland
American expatriate basketball people in Spain
American expatriate basketball people in the Czech Republic
American women's basketball players
Basketball players from Mississippi
Connecticut Sun players
Indiana Fever players
Los Angeles Sparks players
New York Liberty draft picks
New York Liberty players
Memphis Tigers women's basketball players
Power forwards (basketball)
Sportspeople from Tupelo, Mississippi
Tupelo High School alumni
Women's National Basketball Association All-Stars